The U.S. Department of Commerce Office of Inspector General (DOC OIG) is one of the Inspector General offices created by the Inspector General Act of 1978. The Inspector General for the Department of Commerce is charged with investigating and auditing department programs to combat waste, fraud, and abuse.

History of Inspectors General

References 

Commerce Office of Inspector General, Department of
United States Department of Commerce
United States Department of Commerce agencies